Courage International, also known as Courage Apostolate and Courage for short, is an approved apostolate of the Catholic Church that counsels "men and women with same-sex attractions in living chaste lives in fellowship, truth and love". Based on a treatment model for drug and alcohol addictions used in programs like Alcoholics Anonymous (AA), Courage runs a peer support program aimed at helping gay people remain abstinent from same-sex sexual activity.

The organization runs support groups led by a priest to encourage its members to abstain from acting on their homosexual desires and to live according to the teachings of the Catholic Church on homosexuality. Courage also has a ministry geared towards the relatives and friends of gay people called Encourage.

The apostolate was endorsed by the Pontifical Council for the Family in 1994 through the statement of Alfonso Cardinal López Trujillo.

Courage has received criticism from LGBT advocacy groups, such as New Ways Ministry, which say that Courage's methods are "problematic and very dangerous to people's spiritual health". In 2015, the Southern Poverty Law Center listed Courage International as one of the ten most prominent "ex-gay" anti-LGBT organizations.

History 
Terence Cardinal Cooke, Archbishop of New York, conceived the ministry in the early 1980s as a spiritual support system which would assist gay Catholics in adhering to the teachings of the Church on sexuality and sexual behavior. Cooke invited the moral theologian Fr. John F. Harvey, O.S.F.S., to come to New York to begin the work of Courage with Fr. Benedict Groeschel, C.F.R. The first meeting was held in September 1980 at the Shrine of Mother Seton in South Ferry.

Courage faced resistance from its establishment from conservative Catholics who did not believe any such organisation should be directing its attention fully towards supporting openly gay and lesbian Catholics. However, Courage maintained a number of endorsements from senior bishops of the Church.

In 2003, it became a member of Positive Alternatives to Homosexuality.

Father Harvey's successor was Father Paul Check. He states the program does not support conversion therapy. He has at times been asked to comment on the group experiencing protests from those who object to its belief homosexual activity is sinful.

The current Executive Director of Courage, International is Father Philip Bochanski. Bochanski identifies the group's five goals as: living chastity; developing a life of prayer and dedication; helping one another by sharing experiences; forming chaste friendships; and giving good examples to others.

Courage and Ignatius Press organized a Pre-Synod conference, "Living the Truth in Love", which took place in Rome on 2 October 2015 to address the pastoral needs of gay Catholics. The conference featured George Cardinal Pell and Robert Cardinal Sarah, and Jennifer Roback Morse of the Ruth Institute, among other speakers; it also heard the testimony of Catholic homosexuals who followed the doctrine of the Church on sexuality.

Organization and practices 
Courage is officially recognized by the Church hierarchy, and was endorsed by the Roman Curia. It is financially supported by the Archdiocese of New York and the Archdiocese of Bridgeport, Connecticut, as well as donations. Individual chapters are self-supporting and exist with the permission of their diocesan bishop. The United States Conference of Catholic Bishops (USCCB) recommended Courage as a ministry to gay Catholics in their 2006 publication, Ministry to Persons with a Homosexual Inclination.

There are chapters in many U.S. cities and several foreign countries. In 2005, Courage formed a branch for Spanish-speakers called Courage Latino based in Cuernavaca, Mexico.  It currently extends to seven countries: Mexico, El Salvador, Guatemala, Argentina, Colombia, Spain, and Venezuela.

Courage does not practice conversion therapy, but offers counseling based on the 12-step program for addictions treatment developed by Alcoholics Anonymous (AA). The steps were adapted with the permission of the AA, but without further participation from the latter. Courage describes its goals as "chastity, prayer and dedication, fellowship, support, good example".  The organization believes that physical and mental suffering can often be a consequence of moral corruption or vice, and that same-sex attraction is a "cross to bear" and an opportunity to grow in holiness. The SPLC claims that the founder of Courage, John Harvey, believed homosexuality was pathological, which contradicts the official positions of the main American professional associations, such as American Psychiatric Association, the American Psychological Association, the American Academy of Pediatrics, the American Counseling Association, and the National Association of Social Workers, among others, which have all stated that homosexuality is not a disorder and cannot be changed. However, Catholics point out that those institutions de-pathologized homosexuality largely under political pressure from various pro-LGBT groups and figures during the 1970s.

Criticism from LGBT advocacy groups 
Courage has faced criticism over the years in its approach from Catholics who disagree with Church teachings on homosexuality and argue that the organization promotes "mandatory celibacy for gays and lesbians".

Hostility has at times broken out between the groups working with these communities. Harvey has set Courage in opposition to DignityUSA and has publicly criticised New Ways Ministry on a number of occasions. Both DignityUSA and New Ways Ministry have suggested that having a lesbian or gay identity is a blessing from God, and that Courage is being "anti-pastoral" in its work. Dignity and NWM have called for a stronger attempt at reconciliation with gay Catholics and recognition that stable same-sex relationships may be a good thing.

The leaders of New Ways Ministry, Jeannine Gramick, and Fr. Robert Nugent do not recommend Courage to Catholics, because they fundamentally disagree with its approach, particularly because its founder John Harvey insisted that homosexuality was an illness or disorder. The executive director of DignityUSA said in 2014 that "Courage is really problematic and very dangerous to people’s spiritual health. And we have been very concerned about it for a lot of years".

The Southern Poverty Law Center included a description of Courage International in a report on the ten most prominent ex-gay, anti-LGBT groups in 2015, and the National LGBTQ Task Force wrote in a report that the "ex-gay industry" was "re-framing its attack on homosexuality in kinder, gentler terms" in a way that undermines progress towards LGBT rights.

In France, three organizations wrote a letter to a local mayor's office in August 2016 to denounce meetings that had been held by Courage International in a municipal building. They objected to Courage's view that individuals who identify as LGBT are "wounded people" and its claims to offer a "perfect path towards chastity" using AA's 12-step model, which they viewed as "homophobic, humiliating, and discriminatory". The joint letter was written by the Human Rights League, Rainbow Chalon-sur-Saône, and Secular Solidarity 71 ( 71).

See also

Catholics United
Ex-Ex-Gay
GLAAD
Homophobia
Homosexuality and Roman Catholicism
Jews Offering New Alternatives to Homosexuality (JONAH)
Matthew Shepard Foundation
North Star (organization)
Persecution of Homosexuals in Nazi Germany
The Trevor Project
True Freedom Trust

References

Further reading 
  – The author, spokesman for Courage in the Archdiocese of Seattle, criticizes the use of stereotypes and hate-speech directed against gay people.
  – Morrison is the founder and moderator of "Courage Online", an online support group sponsored by Courage International.

External links 
 
 
 

LGBT and Catholicism
Catholic lay organisations